Vice Admiral Sir Benjamin Charles Stanley Martin  (18 July 1891 – 3 June 1957) was a Royal Navy officer who was the first boy from the Royal Naval Hospital School, Greenwich, to reach flag rank in the Royal Navy. He was also the first officer from the lower deck to become a rear admiral on the active list in modern times and only the second, after Sir Thomas Spence Lyne, to achieve flag rank at all in the same period.

Naval career
Martin was born on 18 July 1891 to Benjamin S. Martin and Alice (née Gawn). He attended the Royal Naval Hospital School in Greenwich, graduating into the Royal Navy in 1907 as boy sailor, first class.

On 13 October 1916, Martin was commissioned as Mate, and following a short transfer to a destroyer he returned to Malaya.

Following his promotion to commander on 30 June 1931, Martin take charge of HMS Voyager as a division leader in the 1st Destroyer Flotilla in the Mediterranean. With promotion to the rank of captain on 30 June 1935, Martin commanded the sloop  on the China Station. After a spell at the Admiralty, Martin took command of the cruiser .

Sinking of Bismarck
After intercepting the damaged Bismarck, Dorsetshire was ordered to attack the German battleship with torpedoes, which helped sink the battleship on 27 May. Martin was awarded a Distinguished Service Order for his actions.

In 1942 Martin was appointed Commodore in Charge at Durban, and received a CBE in the 1944 New Year honours. With his promotion to rear admiral on 7 July 1944, Martin became the first officer in 87 years to reach active flag rank having started on the lower decks. Shortly afterwards he was given command of the landing force aboard  of the Eastern Fleet in 1945.

Martin retired from the Royal Navy and in recognition of his service he was awarded a KBE in June, 1946. He was promoted to vice admiral on the retired list on 2 September 1948.

Awards and honours
 Mention in Despatches, Captain Benjamin Charles Stanley Martin, Royal Navy, 1 January 1941.
  To be Companions of the Distinguished Service Order: Captain Benjamin Charles Stanley Martin, Royal Navy, H.M.S. Dorsetshire.

 To be Additional Knights Commanders of the Military Division of the said Most Excellent Order, Rear-Admiral Benjamin Charles Stanley Martin, C.B.E., D.S.O, 7 June 1946.

References

1891 births
1957 deaths
Companions of the Distinguished Service Order
Knights Commander of the Order of the Bath
Royal Navy admirals of World War II
Military personnel from the Isle of Wight